The Rocket Launcher T34 (Calliope) was a tank-mounted multiple rocket launcher used by the United States Army during World War II. The launcher was placed atop the M4 Sherman, with its prominent vertical side frames anchored to the turret's sides and fired a barrage of  M8 rockets from 60 launch tubes. It was developed in 1943; small numbers were produced and were used by various US armor units in 1944–45. Its name comes from the calliope, a musical instrument also known as a steam organ, which has similar parallel or clustered pipes.

Design 

The T34 version of the Calliope carried 60 rockets arranged in a group of 36 permanent tubes on the top, and a pair of jettisonable groups of 12 tubes (24 tubes in total) on the bottom.

The rack was physically connected to the barrel of the 75 mm gun M2–M6 using an arm. This arm was connected to the rack via a pivoting joint and clamped to the gun with a split ring. This allowed the missile launcher to follow the same elevation and depression arc of +25 to -12 degrees. A large support beam bolted to the left and right turret cheeks supported the weapon placed one meter above the turret.

The rockets were fired electronically using cables that were inserted through the tank commander's hatch. The main gun could not be fired once the rocket launcher had been attached. This caused the tank crews to modify the launcher's installation in the field, thereby allowing the main gun to fire, albeit at a reduced elevation for the launcher. Later models of the launcher also had flame deflectors to help prevent rocket exhaust from entering the engine compartment.

Variants 

 Rocket Launcher T34E1 (Calliope): Same as the T34 but groups of 12 jettisonable tubes replaced by groups of 14 tubes.
 Rocket Launcher T34E2 (Calliope): Almost identical to the T34E1, but had an upgraded firing system.

Service history 

Although Calliopes were originally manufactured before D-Day and were envisioned for bunker-busting duties on the beaches, the proposal was dropped due to the tank's high center of gravity which made its transportation unsteady. Thirty M4s of the 743rd Tank Battalion had the T34 launchers installed to assist a planned push by the 30th Infantry Division in December 1944. The German Ardennes offensive stopped this plan, and the launchers were subsequently removed and not reinstalled on tanks until February 1945 with General Patton's army. In March 1945, when Patton's army was pushing through the Saarland in western Germany, the launchers did manage to see some usage in armored divisions.

In 1945, it was used in various actions by the 2nd, 4th, 6th, 12th, and 14th armored divisions. Although seeing limited action, it was effective as a weapon for psychological warfare. The noise generated by launches was sometimes enough to scare enemy soldiers.

See also 

 Katyusha rocket launcher
 List of U.S. Army Rocket Launchers By Model Number
 MAR-240
 Matilda "Hedgehog"
 Mattress
 Sherman Tulip
 Panzerwerfer
 T40 Whizbang

References

Sources 

 Hunting, David. The New Weapons of the World Encyclopedia. New York City: Diagram Visual Information Ltd., 2007. 
 Nash, Mark (January 27, 2018). "Rocket Launcher T34 'Calliope'". Online Tank Museum.
 Green, Michael. American Tanks and AFVs of World War II. Osprey Publishing, 2014,

External links 

 Military Factory article
 Tech Manual TM 9-394 4.5-inch Rocket Materiel for Ground Use

Self-propelled artillery of the United States
World War II self-propelled artillery
Self-propelled rocket launchers
World War II artillery of the United States
Multiple rocket launchers of the United States
M4 Sherman tanks
Weapons and ammunition introduced in 1944
Tracked self-propelled rocket launchers